Fr. Peter Daly was an Irish priest, c.1788–1868.

Origins and life
Daly is believed to have been native to an area close to Galway City. His brother, Patrick Daly, lived in Newcastle, just outside the city, and his mother was believed to be a Ms. Bermingham. He matriculated at St Patrick's College, Maynooth on 1 September 1812 and was ordained for the wardship of Galway in 1815, being appointed parish priest of St. Nicholas's North in 1818.

During his lifetime he proved an industrious town commissioner (sometimes serving as chairman), was a member of the Lough Corrib Navigation Trustees, a candidate for Bishop of Galway and member of the Gas Board. He undertook a great deal of work during his long life and was for decades a leading citizen of the town. He attracted a great deal of criticism but was held in unswerving loyalty by his admirers.

References

 Fr. Peter Daly (c.1788–1868), Dr. James Mitchell, pp. 27–114, Journal of the Galway Archaeological and Historical Society, Volume 79, 1983–1984.

People from County Galway
19th-century Irish Roman Catholic priests
Alumni of St Patrick's College, Maynooth
1780s births
1868 deaths